WROY (1460 AM, "All Oldies 1460") is an American radio station licensed to serve the community of Carmi, Illinois. WROY broadcasts an oldies format and is owned by Mark and Saundra Lange, through licensee The Original Company, Inc.

History
WROY was first licensed December 13, 1948. The station ran 1,000 watts during daytime hours only. By 1990, nighttime operations had been added, running 85 watts. By 1991, the station had begun airing an oldies format.

References

External links 
WROY's website

Oldies radio stations in the United States
ROY
Radio stations established in 1948
1948 establishments in Illinois